Kányavár is a village in Zala County, Hungary.

Population history
The population of the village has fell considerably since 1870.

References

Populated places in Zala County